Mboka Mwilambwe (born 1970–1971) is an American politician who was elected in 2021 as the first African American mayor of Bloomington, Illinois.

Biography
Mwilambwe was born in the Democratic Republic of the Congo. His father worked for Unicef and Mwilambwe lived in various countries as a youth with stays in Senegal, Ivory Coast, and the Republic of the Congo. In 1990, he moved to central Illinois to attend Illinois State University earning a B.S. in mathematics in 1994 and a M.S. in education in 1996. After school, he accepted a position as the assistant director of the Office of Equal Access and Opportunity at Illinois State University. In 2008, he became a U.S. Citizen. In 2011, he was appointed by then-mayor Steve Stockton to fill a vacancy in Ward 3 on the Bloomington City Council. He was re-elected to a full four-year term on the City Council in 2013 and 2017. Since 2019, he has served as mayor pro tem.

In 2021, he ran for mayor against Mike Straza, Jackie Gunderson, and write-in candidate Misty Metroz. On April 6, 2021, he very narrowly won the election succeeding Tari Renner, who did not seek a third term as mayor. He was sworn in on May 1, 2021 becoming Bloomington's first African-American mayor since its founding in 1830. (In 2019, Bloomington was 73.0% white, 10.2% Black, 8.0% Asian, 6.1% Latino, and 2.2% multi-racial). Top items on his agenda include an emphasis on infrastructure, improving financial efficiency, and facilitating an atmosphere where people can debate in a civil manner.

Personal life
Mwilambwe is married to fellow Illinois State University graduate Stacey Mwilambwe (B.S. ’94, M.S. ’96) who is the director of University Housing Services. He speaks French, Swahili and Lingala.

References

African-American mayors in Illinois
21st-century American politicians
Mayors of places in Illinois
1970s births
Living people
21st-century African-American politicians
American people of Democratic Republic of the Congo descent
Illinois State University alumni